Aviary Takes is the fifth studio album by Australian musician Dan Sultan, released on 15 March 2019. The album sees Sultan recording acoustic and piano versions of his most celebrated tracks from his four studio albums to date, as well as three cover-versions.

Sultan said "Aviary Takes has been a very rewarding and fulfilling experience. I've been able to go over songs from my past catalogue and also record a few tunes from some of my favourite artists. It's very stripped back and it's the first time I've worked with the great and very talented Matt Redlich who produced the sessions."

The album promoted the album with a tour commencing in Hepburn Springs on 23 February and concluding in Port Macquarie on 11 May 2019. Upon announcement of the tour, Sultan said "I'm really looking forward to hitting the regional road with The Aviary Takes tour."

In July 2019, Aviary Takes was nominated for Album of the Year at the National Indigenous Music Awards.

At the ARIA Music Awards of 2019, the album was nominated for ARIA Award for Best Blues and Roots Album.

Reception

   
Josh Leeson from The Herald said "Mostly Aviary Takes is a re-interpretation of Sultan's extensive catalogue. Some tracks like 'Old Fitzroy' experience minor changes, while others like 'Kingdom' breathe with new vitality by being stripped bare. This is the reset Sultan needed."

Track listing

Charts

Release history

References

2019 albums
Dan Sultan albums
Liberation Records albums